Podocarpus chinensis is a species of conifer in the family Podocarpaceae. It is found in China, Japan, and Myanmar.

Etymology
Podocarpus is derived from Greek, meaning ‘stalked fruit’. It was named in reference to the fleshy fruit stalks of some species.

Chinensis means ‘from China’, and is a cognate of ‘sinensis’.

References

chinensis
Least concern plants
Flora of China
Taxonomy articles created by Polbot